Les Attaques is a commune in the Pas-de-Calais department in the Hauts-de-France region of France.

Geography
A large farming and light industrial village located 4 miles (6 km) southeast of Calais, at the junction of the N43 and D248 roads. Both the A26 "autoroute des Anglais" and the Calais-St. Omer canal pass through the commune.

Population

Sights

 The church of St. Pierre, dating from the nineteenth century.
 The nineteenth-century chateau Brûlé.
 Vestiges of a Capuchin abbey.
 A rare four-branch bridge

See also
Communes of the Pas-de-Calais department

References

External links

 Les Attaques official website 

Communes of Pas-de-Calais